Schönau may refer to:

People 
 Horst Schönau, East German bobsledder
 Elizabeth of Schönau, a Benedictine nun at Schönau Abbey of Nassau and a friend of Hildegarde of Bingen

Places

Germany
 Schönau (Odenwald), a town in Baden-Württemberg
 Schönau Abbey, in this town
 Schönau im Schwarzwald, a town in Baden-Württemberg 
 Schönau (Mannheim), a district in the north of Mannheim, Baden-Württemberg
 Schönau an der Brend, a municipality in the district of Rhön-Grabfeld in Bavaria
 Schönau, Lower Bavaria, a municipality in the district of Rottal-Inn in Bavaria
 Schönau am Königsee, a municipality in Bavaria
 Schönau, site of a subcamp of Buchenwald
 Lansen-Schönau, a municipality in Mecklenburg-Western Pomerania
 Schönau, Rhineland-Palatinate, part of Dahner Felsenland
 Schönau-Berzdorf, a municipality in Saxony
 Schönau Abbey (Nassau) of Nassau, near present-day Lipporn, Rhineland-Palatinate
 , an Ortsteil and monastery in Gemünden am Main, Bavaria

Austria
 Schönau im Mühlkreis, in Upper Austria
 Schönau an der Triesting, in Lower Austria

Czech Republic
 Šenov u Nového Jičína, a municipality in Nový Jičín District
 Šonov, a municipality in Náchod District

Poland
 Trzciana, West Pomeranian Voivodeship (formerly Schönau)), a village

See also 
 Schœnau, a commune of the Bas-Rhin department, in France

German-language surnames